"What Your Boyfriend Said" was the eighth single to be released by Little Man Tate. It was released on 2 June 2008 and reached #60 in the UK Singles Chart.

Track listings 

CD
 "What Your Boyfriend Said"
 "Shark Bite"

7", #1
 "What Your Boyfriend Said"
 "Shark Bite"

7", #2
 "What Your Boyfriend Said"
 "She Bought Shoes"

Download
 "What Your Boyfriend Said"

References

2008 singles
Little Man Tate (band) songs
2008 songs